Buhlenberg is an Ortsgemeinde – a municipality belonging to a Verbandsgemeinde, a kind of collective municipality – in the Birkenfeld district in Rhineland-Palatinate, Germany. It belongs to the Verbandsgemeinde of Birkenfeld, whose seat is in the like-named town.

Geography

Location
The municipality lies three kilometres northwest of the district seat of Birkenfeld in the Schwarzwälder Hochwald (forest) in the Hunsrück, on the edge of the Naturpark Saar-Hunsrück near the Erbeskopf, Rhineland-Palatinate's highest mountain.

Constituent communities
Also belonging to Buhlenberg are the outlying homesteads of Berghof, Etzweilerhof, Grenzhof and Waldhof.

History
Buhlenberg once belonged to the "Hinder" County of Sponheim.

From 29 July to 8 August 2009, the Bund der Pfadfinderinnen und Pfadfinder held its National Scout Jamboree in Buhlenberg.

Politics

Municipal council
The council is made up of 12 council members, who were elected by majority vote at the municipal election held on 7 June 2009, and the honorary mayor as chairman.

Mayor
Buhlenberg's mayor is Gunter Kronenberger.

Coat of arms
The German blazon reads: 

The municipality's arms might in English heraldic language be described thus: Per bend sinister chequy of gules and argent and argent issuant from base a mound of three, above which a wolf's head caboshed, both azure.

The “chequy” pattern on the dexter (armsbearer's right, viewer's left) side is a reference to the village's former allegiance to the “Hinder” County of Sponheim, Oberamt of Birkenfeld. The charge in base on the sinister (armsbearer's left, viewer's right) side, known in German heraldry as a Dreiberg, is in part canting for the village's name, at least for the last syllable, for Berg means "mountain" in German, and it also refers to the village's high elevation and the Gebück mountain ridge. The wolf's head refers to the Wolfskaul, an area within municipal limits where there was once a wolf-catching pit.

The arms have been borne since 26 August 1963.

Culture and sightseeing

Buildings
The following are listed buildings or sites in Rhineland-Palatinate's Directory of Cultural Monuments:
 Brückener Straße 2 – stately Quereinhaus (a combination residential and commercial house divided for these two purposes down the middle, perpendicularly to the street) with half-hipped roof, 1911
 Hauptstraße 10 – Quereinhaus, partly timber-frame (plastered), half-hipped roof, essentially possibly about 1800; gravel paving; walled gardens
 Hochwaldstraße 32 – former school; building with mansard roof and turret typical of its time, 1913

Economy and infrastructure

Transport
To the east runs Bundesstraße 269, and to the south runs the Autobahn A 62 (Kaiserslautern–Trier). Serving nearby Neubrücke is a railway station on the Nahe Valley Railway.

References

External links
 Municipality’s official webpage 
 Buhlenberg in the collective municipality’s webpages 
 Brief portrait of Buhlenberg at SWR Fernsehen 

Birkenfeld (district)